Ingrid van Houten-Groeneveld (21 October 1921 – 30 March 2015) was a Dutch astronomer.

Background
In a jointly credited trio with Tom Gehrels and her husband Cornelis Johannes van Houten, she was the discoverer of many thousands of asteroids (credited by the Minor Planet Center with the discovery of 4,641 numbered minor planets). In the Palomar–Leiden survey, Gehrels took the images using the 48-inch Schmidt telescope at Palomar Observatory and shipped the photographic plates to the van Houtens at Leiden Observatory, who analyzed them for new asteroids. The trio are jointly credited with several thousand asteroid discoveries. Van Houten-Groeneveld died on 30 March 2015, at the age of 93, in Oegstgeest, Netherlands.

The Themistian main-belt asteroid 1674 Groeneveld – discovered by Karl Reinmuth at Heidelberg and independently discovered by Finnish astronomer Yrjö Väisälä in 1938, was named in her honor.

Publications

References

External links 
 I. van Houten-Groeneveld home page
 Symposium 85e verjaardag of 4 November 2006 (in Dutch)
 2005 Annual report of the Leiden Observatory, see page 6.

1921 births
2015 deaths
21st-century Dutch astronomers
20th-century women scientists
Discoverers of asteroids

20th-century Dutch astronomers
Dutch women scientists
Academic staff of Leiden University
Scientists from Berlin
Women astronomers